"All Because of You" is the first single by Marques Houston taken from his second album, Naked. It features a sample of the 1978 hit single, "Living Together in Sin" by The Whispers. It follows his previous single, the similarly named "Because of You" from his first album.

"All Because of You" is the first track on Naked. The video and song feature his former bandmate, Young Rome.

The single was released only within the United States. It did well enough there to chart on the Billboard Hot 100, peaking at number sixty-nine.

Music video
The video shows Marques in a car driving to his apartment. When he arrives he finds out his girlfriend is moving out. It then shows her and Marques in the hallway. The video featured his former IMx bandmates, Young Rome and Kelton "LDB" Kessee.

The music video was on constant rotation on BET's 106 & Park and has peaked at #1 on the show's countdown for a week.

Charts

Weekly charts

Year-end charts

References

2005 singles
Marques Houston songs
Songs written by Rico Love
Songs written by Marques Houston
2005 songs
Songs written by Pierre Medor
Songs written by Van McCoy
Songs written by Young Rome